The 2021 New Mexico Bowl was a college football bowl game played on December 18, 2021, with kickoff at 2:15 p.m. EST (12:15 p.m. local MST) on ESPN. It was the 16th edition of the New Mexico Bowl, and was one of the 2021–22 bowl games concluding the 2021 FBS football season. Due to sponsorship from video game PlayerUnknown's Battlegrounds Mobile, the game was branded as the 2021 PUBG Mobile New Mexico Bowl.

Teams
Consistent with conference tie-ins, the game will be played between teams from the Conference USA (C-USA) and Mountain West Conference (MWC). The bowl also has a tie-in with the American Athletic Conference (AAC).

This will be the thirteenth meeting between UTEP and Fresno State; the Bulldogs lead the all-time series 8-3-1.  From 1992 until 2004, both teams were together as members of the Western Athletic Conference.

UTEP Miners

The Miner started out their season at 2-0, after beating both New Mexico State and Bethune–Cookman (FCS). The program suffered its first loss against Boise State. Following the loss they won 4 games in a row against with a record of 6-1, New Mexico, Old Dominion, Southern Miss, and Louisiana Tech. After the 4 game winning streak, they followed up 3 straight losses to Florida Atlantic, UTSA and North Texas. The Miners ended their 4 game losing streak with a win over Rice. To end their season UTEP lost to UAB for a final record of 7-5.

Fresno State Bulldogs

Game summary

Statistics

References

External links
 Game statistics at statbroadcast.com

New Mexico Bowl
New Mexico Bowl
Fresno State Bulldogs football bowl games
UTEP Miners football bowl games
New Mexico Bowl
New Mexico Bowl